Minuscule 97 (in the Gregory-Aland numbering), α 260 (von Soden), is a Greek language minuscule manuscript of the New Testament, on parchment leaves. Palaeographically it has been assigned to the 12th century. The manuscript is lacunose. Formerly it was labelled by 97a and 241p.

Description
The codex contains a complete text of the Acts of the Apostles, Catholic epistles, and Pauline epistles on 204 leaves (size ) with only one lacuna (Acts 16:39-17:18). The text is written in one column per page, 27 lines per page.

It has marginal scholia from Chrysostom and Œcumenius.

The Greek text of the codex is a representative of the Byzantine text-type. Kurt Aland placed it in Category V.

History
Formerly the manuscript was deposited by one Theodoret in the Catechumens library of the Great Lavra monastery on the Mount Athos. It came from Athos to Germany. The text of the manuscript was collated by Langer, librarian at Wolfenbüttel, for Griesbach. C. R. Gregory did not see this manuscript.

Formerly it was labelled by 97a and 241p. In 1908 Gregory gave for it number 97.

It is currently housed at the Herzog August Bibliothek (Codd. Gud. Graec. 104.2), at Wolfenbüttel.

See also

List of New Testament minuscules
Biblical manuscript
Textual criticism

References

Further reading

Greek New Testament minuscules
12th-century biblical manuscripts
Herzog August Library